Clonbullogue or Clonbolloge is a village in County Offaly, Ireland.

Location

The village is located at the junction of the R401 and R442 regional roads.
The Figile River runs through the village under the R442 near its confluence with the Philipstown River.

Between the village and Edenderry, 11 km to the north, lies the Bog of Allen.

Clonbullogue is located near the point where three counties—Offaly, Laois and Kildare meet. The village is on an island of pasture land in the bog of Allen.

The area is marked on the Cottonian map 1653 of Leix & Offaly as Clanbolg. In the 1659 Census, Robert Shallcross was listed as the titled person in the area. In 1679, Charles II granted this area to the Purefoy family and for a time the village was called Purefoy's Place. In 1798, the village was burned—the only part of Offaly to suffer this fate during the Rebellion. Two of the Wexford leaders, Colonel Anthony Perry and Father Mogue Kearns were captured here and were later hanged at Edenderry for their part in the 1798 Rebellion.

In 1883, Father Comerford wrote: "The village of Clonbullogue which is situated on the Little Barrow presents a decayed and ruinous appearance, some of the larger houses having been burned during the rebellion of 1798".

Population
As of the 2016 census, the population of the village was 436. The village population expanded in the 1950s to accommodate the workers employed to develop the area's bogs as an energy resource under the guidance of the Irish state company Bord na Móna.

The village population suffered severe declines from famine, poverty and emigration from the mid-1840s. In 1861 the population of the village was 110, and by 1871 had fallen to 79.

Heritage 
Antiquities in the area include the Clonkeen stone. This is said to be 340 million years old and legend has it that the stone was thrown from Croghan Hill by Fionn MacCumhaill. Other sites includes the remains of a togher at Ballykilleen, the ruins of Cloncrane Church, a ring-barrow at Shean and a sheela-na-gig from Ballynowlart and Clonsast. The last was an important religious site in early monastic Ireland.

Clonbullogue airfield 

Clonbullogue airfield is owned and operated by the Irish Parachute Club who are based at the field. The airfield has one east-west grass strip runway which is 770m long and 18m wide. There are six aircraft based on the field, most of them owned by the Irish Parachute Club. On 13 May 2018 a plane from this airfield carrying 16 parachutists crashed, killing the pilot and a seven year old boy.

Sport
Clonbullogue soccer club known as Saint Patricks won the Division 2 league in 2004. GAA club won the junior championship in the 1980s and played intermediate until 2013 when they were relegated to junior again. They won the junior A championship again in 2015 promoting them to intermediate once again.

People  
With the conquest of Ireland from the Cromwellian wars onwards, Clonbullogue was extensively planted by colonialists. Quaker families were common under the plantations. Present day local family names can reflect these plantations. In 1731, Rev. Boyle Travers, Protestant Rector of Rathangan and Clonmore (which includes part of this area) notes; "I bless God for the comforting assurance I have that there is no reputed friary, nunnery, friars, nuns or Popish schools".

Eamon Broy, former Garda Commissioner, was born near Clonbullogue in 1887 and is buried in a nearby cemetery.
Alex Dunne, motorsport racing driver, winner of the 2022 F4 British Championship
Jasper Robert Joly  1819–1892, was born at Clonsast. He donated his extensive library of 23,000 printed volumes and unbound papers to the Royal Dublin Society in 1863. When the National Library was established the Joly collection formed the nucleus of the new national institution.

See also 
 List of towns and villages in Ireland

References

Towns and villages in County Offaly